Khoren is an Armenian given name. Notable people with the name include:

Khoren Bayramyan (born 1992), Russian professional football player of Armenian descent
Khoren Kalashyan (born 1984), Armenian football agent
Khoren Gevor (born 1980), Armenian-German professional boxer
Khoren I Paroian (1914–1983), the Catholicos of the Holy See of Cilicia, from 1963 to 1983
Khoren I of Armenia (1873–1938), the Catholicos of the Armenian Apostolic Church from 1932 to 1938
Khoren Hovhannisyan (born 1955), former Armenian and Soviet football midfielder, member of the USSR national football team
Khoren Sargsian (1891–1970), Armenian writer, critic, doctor of philology, and professor

See also
 Moses of Chorene or Moses of Khoren, also known as Movses Khorenatsi, (ca. 410 – 490s AD), Armenian historian and author of The History of Armenia
 Korean (disambiguation)
 Koreng
 Kühren

Armenian given names
Armenian masculine given names